Tanay Thyagarajan (born 15 November 1995) is an Indian cricketer. He made his List A debut for Hyderabad in the 2017–18 Vijay Hazare Trophy on 21 February 2018. He made his first-class debut for Hyderabad in the 2018–19 Ranji Trophy on 20 November 2018. He was the leading wicket-taker for Hyderabad in the tournament, with 17 dismissals in five matches.

References

External links
 

1995 births
Living people
Indian cricketers
Place of birth missing (living people)
Hyderabad cricketers